Ian Jenkins (born 1941, Rothesay) is a former Scottish Liberal Democrat politician. He was the Member of the Scottish Parliament (MSP) for Tweeddale, Ettrick and Lauderdale from 1999 to 2003.

He was a teacher before his election to Holyrood, ending his career as head of the English department at Peebles High School. He was the Liberal Democrat spokesperson for Education, Culture and Sport. He stood down at the 2003 election.

External links
 
Ian Jenkins MSP biography at the Scottish Parliament website

1941 births
Living people
Members of the Scottish Parliament 1999–2003
Liberal Democrat MSPs
People from Rothesay, Bute